The 2009–10 KCC Professional Basketball season was the 14th season of the Korean Basketball League.

Regular season

Playoffs

Prize money
Ulsan Mobis Phoebus: KRW 200,000,000 (champions + regular-season 1st place)
Jeonju KCC Egis: KRW 80,000,000 (runners-up + regular-season 3rd place)
Busan KT Sonicboom: KRW 50,000,000 (regular-season 2nd place)

External links
Official KBL website (Korean & English)

2009–10
2009–10 in South Korean basketball
2009–10 in Asian basketball leagues